Super Saturday or Panic Saturday is the last Saturday before Christmas, a major day of revenue for retailers in the United States, marking the end of the shopping season. 

Super Saturday may also refer to:

Super Saturday primaries, an event occurring during the US primary elections
"Super Saturday" (2012 Summer Olympics), Day 8 (4 August) of the 2012 Summer Olympics, when the UK recorded its most successful day at the Olympics in 104 years
"Super Saturday" (Six Nations), in rugby, a day during the annual Six Nations Championship on which all six competing teams are playing matches
Super Saturday (TV series) (also called Super Sunday), 1980s US animated television series produced by Sunbow Productions and Marvel Productions
July 2018 Australian federal by-elections held on Saturday 28 July 2018, a day when Australia held five by-elections due to the 2017–18 Australian parliamentary eligibility crisis
 Super Saturday (Brexit), Saturday 19 October 2019, when the UK Parliament sat (Saturday sittings are normally only held in time of war) to consider a proposed European Union withdrawal agreement
 February 2022 New South Wales state by-elections held on Saturday 12 February 2022, referred to as "Super Saturday" by the NSW media
 2022 Bega by-election
 2022 Monaro by-election
 2022 Strathfield by-election
 2022 Willoughby by-election
 Ahead of an edition of the Eurovision Song Contest, a Saturday (often in February and March) where several national broadcasters hold national finals in order to select their act, at or around prime time.
 Ahead of a further easing of COVID-19 lockdown restrictions in the UK, the British media dubbed 4 July 2020 "Super Saturday" wherein restaurants, hairdressers, and pubs, amongst other establishments, were allowed to re-open subject to social distancing and current lockdown measures.